Barun Sengupta Metro Station is a station of Line 6 of the Kolkata Metro close to Science City at Parama Island, Dhapa. The station is named in honour of the founder of Bartaman, Barun Sengupta.

See also
List of Kolkata Metro stations

References 

Kolkata Metro stations
Railway stations in Kolkata